The  were held at Ajinomoto Stadium in Chōfu. Organised by JAAF, the three-day competition took place from June 7–9 and served as the national championships in track and field for the Japan. The competition was for the qualifying trial for the Japan team at the 2013 World Championships.

During the competition, 3 new championship records were set in the events. Koji Murofushi won the hummer throw's national champions for nineteen consecutive years. For the Most Valuable Player of the Championships, Ryota Yamagata and Hitomi Niiya were selected.

The competition was broadcast on television by NHK.

Medal summary

Men

Women

Official Sponsor 
 Yamazaki Baking (Special Sponsor)
 ASICS
 Otsuka Pharmaceutical
 Japan Airlines
 Nishi Sports
 Cerespo
 Keio Corporation (Special Offer)

References
  . Japan Association of Athletics Federations. Retrieved 4 July 2013.

External links
 Official website at JAAF
 The 97th Japan Championships in Athletics at JapanAthleticsTV (Official video site) at JAAF

Japan Championships in Athletics
Japan Outdoors
Track, Outdoor